Moritz Porges (1857–1909) was a Jewish Czech chess player.

In 1882, he tied for 4–7th in Vienna (Vincenz Hruby won).

In 1892, he shared 2nd with Gyula Makovetz, behind Siegbert Tarrasch, in Dresden (the 7th DSB Congress).

He tied for 16–17th at Nuremberg 1896 (Emanuel Lasker won).

In 1902, he took 3rd, behind Viktor Tietz and Dawid Janowski, in Carlsbad (Triangular).

External links

Biography
"Jewish Chess Players"

1857 births
1909 deaths
Czech Jews
Czech chess players
Jewish chess players
19th-century chess players